Heteroteuthis serventyi is a species of bobtail squid native to the southwestern Pacific Ocean, off southeastern Australia.

The type specimen was collected in Jervis Bay, New South Wales and is deposited at the Australian Museum in Sydney. Some authorities consider H. serventyi to be a synonym of Heteroteuthis dagamensis

References

External links 

Bobtail squid
Molluscs described in 1945